Wola is a western district of Warsaw.

Wola or WOLA may also refer to:

Places
Wola, part of the district of Jeżyce in Poznań
Wola, Lipno County in Kuyavian-Pomeranian Voivodeship (north-central Poland)
Wola, Żnin County in Kuyavian-Pomeranian Voivodeship (north-central Poland)
Wola, Masovian Voivodeship (east-central Poland)
Wola, Pomeranian Voivodeship (north Poland)
Wola, Silesian Voivodeship (south Poland)
Wola, Subcarpathian Voivodeship (south-east Poland)
Wola, Bartoszyce County in Warmian-Masurian Voivodeship (north Poland)
Wola, Iława County in Warmian-Masurian Voivodeship (north Poland)
Wola, Kętrzyn County in Warmian-Masurian Voivodeship (north Poland)
Wola, Nidzica County in Warmian-Masurian Voivodeship (north Poland)
Wola, Węgorzewo County in Warmian-Masurian Voivodeship (north Poland)
Wola, Mali

Other uses
Wola people, an indigenous group of Papua New Guinea
Wola (settlement), a type of agricultural settlement in Poland from the 13th century onwards
Washington Office on Latin America
WebSphere Optimized Local Adapters
Weighted overlap-add filterbank, (not overlap–add method)
WOLA (AM), a radio station in Barranquitas, Puerto Rico